William Flower may refer to:

William Flower (officer of arms) (c. 1498–1588), herald, Norroy King of Arms in the reign of Elizabeth I of England
William Flower (martyr), burnt 1555 during the Marian Persecutions
William Flower, 1st Baron Castle Durrow (1685–1746), Irish peer and MP for Kilkenny County and Portarlington
William Henry Flower (1831–1899), English comparative anatomist and surgeon
William Way (c. 1560–1588), Catholic martyr executed at Kingston upon Thames